Capillaster is a genus of crinoids. It contains the following species:

 Capillaster asterias AH Clark, 1931
 Capillaster gracilicirra AH Clark, 1912
 Capillaster macrobrachius (Hartlaub, 1890)
 Capillaster mariae (AH Clark, 1907)
 Capillaster multiradiatus (Linnaeus, 1758)
 Capillaster sentosus (Carpenter, 1888)
 Capillaster squarrosus Messing, 2003
 Capillaster tenuicirrus AH Clark, 1912

References

Crinoid genera
Comatulidae